Avanhard Stadium is a multi-purpose stadium in Lutsk, Ukraine. It is currently used mostly for football matches, and is the home of FC Volyn Lutsk. The stadium holds 12,080 people and was opened in 1960.

Sports venues completed in 1960
Sports venues built in the Soviet Union
Football venues in Ukraine
Multi-purpose stadiums in Ukraine
Buildings and structures in Lutsk
Sport in Lutsk
Football venues in the Soviet Union
Athletics (track and field) venues in the Soviet Union
Athletics (track and field) venues in Ukraine
FC Volyn Lutsk
Avanhard (sports society)
Sports venues in Volyn Oblast